Broadway's Best was an album by Jo Stafford, released in 1953 by Columbia Records. Stafford sings songs from famous Broadway shows backed by Paul Weston and his Orchestra.  This album by Columbia was never re-released on compact disc. An MP3 album was issued in 2008.

Track listing 

Side One

 "Come Rain or Come Shine" (Harold Arlen, Johnny Mercer) - 3:13
 "They Say It's Wonderful" (Irving Berlin)        - 3:14
 "My Romance" (Richard Rodgers, Lorenz Hart) - 3:23
 "Dancing in the Dark" (Arthur Schwartz, Howard Dietz) - 2:39
 "Spring Is Here"  (Richard Rodgers, Lorenz Hart) - 2:50
 "I'm Your Girl"  (Richard Rodgers, Oscar Hammerstein II)

Side Two

 "Embraceable You" (George Gershwin, Ira Gershwin) - 2:34
 "September Song" (Kurt Weill, Maxwell Anderson) - 3:22
 "Something to Remember You By" (Arthur Schwartz, Howard Dietz) - 3:07
 "All the Things You Are" (Jerome Kern, Oscar Hammerstein II) - 3:05
 "Make the Man Love Me" (Arthur Schwartz, Dorothy Fields)
 "Night and Day" (Cole Porter)

References

Jo Stafford albums
1953 albums
Columbia Records albums
Albums conducted by Paul Weston